The Peak Terminus is the upper terminus of the Peak Tram funicular railway line. It is located inside the Peak Tower at Victoria Gap, the Peak, Central and Western District, Hong Kong, 398m above sea level.

History
The station was opened on 30 May 1888 along with the tram line.

Usage 
As the tram itself and also the Peak are world-famous scenic spots and attractions, many tourists to Hong Kong take the tram and visit the Peak. Thus the usage of the station is very high: as of 2007, more than 4 million people were riding the Peak Tram annually, or an average of over 11,000 every day.

Neighbouring landmarks 
 Peak Tower
 The Peak Galleria

References

External links
 

Peak Tram stations
Railway stations in Hong Kong opened in 1888
Victoria Peak